The 2018 Moscow River Cup was a women's tennis tournament played on outdoor clay courts. It was the first edition of the event and part of the WTA International tournaments of the 2018 WTA Tour. It took place at the National Tennis Center in Moscow, Russia from 23 through 29 July 2018.

Singles main-draw entrants

Seeds

1 Rankings as of July 16, 2018.

Other entrants
The following players received wildcards into the singles main draw:
  Antonia Lottner
  Anastasia Potapova

The following players received entry using a protected ranking into the singles main draw:
  Laura Siegemund

The following players received entry from the qualifying draw:
  Paula Badosa Gibert
  Deborah Chiesa
  Varvara Flink
  Valentini Grammatikopoulou
  Valentyna Ivakhnenko
  Martina Trevisan

The following players received entry as lucky losers:
  Irina Bara
  Olga Danilović

Withdrawals
Before the tournament
  Irina-Camelia Begu → replaced by  Irina Bara
  Mihaela Buzărnescu → replaced by  Viktoriya Tomova
  Sara Errani → replaced by  Anna Karolína Schmiedlová
  Polona Hercog → replaced by  Vera Zvonareva
  Petra Martić → replaced by  Olga Danilović
  Yulia Putintseva → replaced by  Tamara Zidanšek
  Elena Vesnina → replaced by  Ekaterina Alexandrova

During the tournament
  Anastasija Sevastova

Retirements
  Tamara Zidanšek

Doubles main-draw entrants

Seeds

1 Rankings as of July 16, 2018.

Other entrants 
The following pairs received wildcards into the doubles main draw:
  Sofya Lansere /  Elena Rybakina
  Polina Monova /  Maryna Zanevska

Champions

Singles

  Olga Danilović def.  Anastasia Potapova, 7–5, 6–7(1–7), 6–4

Doubles

  Anastasia Potapova /  Vera Zvonareva def.  Alexandra Panova /  Galina Voskoboeva, 6–0, 6–3

References
General
Official website
Specific

Moscow River Cup
Moscow River Cup
2018 in Russian tennis
Moscow River Cup
2018 in Moscow